Zaitao (23 June 1887 – 2 September 1970), courtesy name Shuyuan, art name Yeyun, was a Manchu prince of the Qing dynasty. He was a half-brother of the Guangxu Emperor and an uncle of Puyi, the last Emperor of China.

Biography
Zaitao was born in the Manchu Aisin Gioro clan as the seventh son of Yixuan (Prince Chun). His family was under the Plain Red Banner of the Eight Banners. He was adopted by an older male relative, Yimo (奕謨; 1850–1905), who had no son to succeed him.

In 1890, during the reign of the Guangxu Emperor, Zaitao was granted the title of a second class . In 1898, Zaitao was transferred from Yimo's lineage to the lineage of Yihe (奕詥; 1844–1868), Prince Zhong of the Second Rank, as Yihe's adopted son because Yihe had no son to succeed him. He was made an acting  in the same year.

A year later, during the reign of the Xuantong Emperor, Zaitao was put in charge of the Military Consultancy (軍諮處). In 1910, he visited eight countries – Japan, the United States, Britain, France, Germany, Italy, Austria, and Russia – to observe and learn from their more advanced armed forces. In May 1910, he was sent to Britain as an ambassador to represent the Qing Empire at the funeral of King Edward VII.

In 1911, Zaitao was appointed as the Minister of the Military Consultancy (軍諮大臣) and placed in charge of the Imperial Guard (禁衛軍), as well as being appointed as chief of general staff. He was also designated as the commander of the Mongol Bordered Yellow Banner. In January 1912, after the fall of the Qing Empire, Zaitao, along with Zaixun and others from the imperial clan, founded the Royalist Party (宗社黨) to preserve their ancestral temple. In 1917, when the warlord Zhang Xun briefly restored Puyi to the throne, Zaitao was appointed as the Commanding Officer of the Imperial Guards.

In 1931, Zaitao was recruited by the Nationalist Government of the Republic of China to join the National Crisis Conference (國難會議). After the People's Republic of China was established in 1949, Zaitao served as a member of the National People's Congress and Chinese People's Political Consultative Conference.

Zaitao fancied horses. In his early years, he studied cavalry warfare in the Saumur Cavalry School in France. After 1949, he served as a consultant on horses in the artillery formation of the People's Liberation Army. During the Korean War, he went to Inner Mongolia to choose horses for the People’s Volunteer Army.

Zaitao was also interested in Beijing opera. He was trained in both long and short range types of performing martial arts, and specialised in playing monkey roles in opera. He was tutored by Yang Xiaolou (楊小樓) and Zhang Qilin (張淇林). Opera actor Li Wanchun (李萬春) trained under Zaitao for three years.

Zaitao died in Beijing in 1970 at the age of 83.

Family 
Wife

 Wife, of the Jiang clan (1885–1949), personal name Wanzhen
 First son (1905)
 First daughter (b. 6 March 1906)
 Second daughter (24 December 1906 – 1969), personal name Yunhui
 Married Darijaya (1904–1968) of the Alxa Borjigit clan in 1925, and had issue (one son, six daughters)
 Pujia (1908–1979), second son
 Pu'an (1911–1944), third son
 Pushen (1915–1928), fourth son

Concubine

 Concubine, of the Zhou clan (b. 1894), personal name Mengyun
 Puxi (1924–1983), fifth son

 Concubine, of the Jin clan (1906–1967), personal name Xiaolan
 Pushi (b. 1940), sixth son

 Concubine, of the Wang clan (1917–2003), personal name Naiwen

Ancestry

Gallery

See also
 Prince Zhong
 Prince Hui (first rank)
 Royal and noble ranks of the Qing dynasty#Male members
 Ranks of imperial consorts in China#Qing

Sources

References

Further reading
 

1880s births
1970 deaths
Qing dynasty imperial princes
Republic of China politicians from Beijing
Manchu politicians
Delegates to the 1st National People's Congress
Delegates to the 2nd National People's Congress
Delegates to the 3rd National People's Congress
Members of the 2nd Chinese People's Political Consultative Conference
Members of the 3rd Chinese People's Political Consultative Conference
Burials at Babaoshan Revolutionary Cemetery
Prince Hui (first rank)
Prince Zhong